Gambueh-ye Kuchek (also Romanized as Gambū‘eh-ye Kūchek, Gombooehé Koochak, and Gombū‘eh-ye Kūchek; also known as Qombu‘eh-ye Kūchak) is a village in Jahad Rural District, Hamidiyeh District, Ahvaz County, Khuzestan Province, Iran. At the 2006 census, its population was 359, in 57 families.

References 

Populated places in Ahvaz County